Romanichthys is a genus of ray-finned fish, one of two genera in the tribe Romanichthyini, which along with the tribe Luciopercini, forms the subfamily Luciopercinae of the family Percidae, alongside the perches, ruffes, and darters. The genus contains the single species Romanichthys valsanicola, known as the sculpin-perch, asprete, or Romanian darter.

This fish was described in 1957 by Romanian student scientists M. Dumitrescu, P. Bănărescu, and N. Stoica. Local names include asprete, poprete, and  sforete. Endemic to a very restricted area in southern Romania, it was found in the upper reach of the Argeş River  and in two of its tributaries: Râul Doamnei and Vâlsan. Due to hydrotechnical constructions and deterioration of its habitat, it survived only in the tributary Vâlsan.

Description
It can be distinguished from other European perches by the two clearly separate dorsal fins, the first with eight or nine spines, the anal fin having 7½ branched rays and  58–68 scales along the lateral line. The fish is considered to be a living fossil, having survived unchanged for millions of years.

Biology
The time of reproduction is in May and June. The female lays 120 to 150 eggs under rocks. This fish is active at night and feeds on the aquatic larvae of insects such as stoneflies (Plecoptera), caddisflies (Trichoptera), and mayflies (Ephemeroptera). It hides under stones during the day. It is a nocturnal species that is highly territorial, and the territories are aggressively defended at night.

Status
This species is an endangered freshwater fish and is found on the red list of the IUCN, where it is rated as critically endangered. Its area of distribution has drastically diminished, and it is now considered to be the European fish genus with the most restricted range. The last remaining population in the Vâlsan River is totally reliant on the amount of water released by the reservoir immediately upstream. A Romanian NGO, the Bucharest Institute of Biology, has worked to preserve this species with the financial support of the Regional Environmental Center. Official estimates assert that no more than 15 specimens are living in a 1-km2 area of the Valsan; observations as of October 2022 have confirmed 58 individuals.

Taxonomy
Romanichthys is the sister taxon of the four species in the genus Zingel and some evidence suggests that these two genera may be a single genus and that the asprete should be classified within Zingel.

References

External links
 BBC:  "Back from the dead: Race to save Romania's 65 million-year-old fish" (2020.11.08)
 

Luciopercinae
Endemic fauna of Romania
Monotypic freshwater fish genera
Taxa named by Petre Mihai Bănărescu